Micro Mouse Goes Debugging is a computer game for the ZX Spectrum. It was released by MC Lothlorien in 1983.

Gameplay
The premise was to control Micro Mouse around a screen which contained lines of BASIC program, some of which is missing. While Micro Mouse is replacing the code, he must avoid bugs which will try to kill you and also pinch part of the code. Micro Mouse's only form of defense was a can of data kill.

Legacy
MC Lothlorien produced another game of the same name in 1989 which was released by Mastertronic. It was also released for the Amstrad CPC and the Commodore 64. This has completely different gameplay compared to the original.  In this version, you guided Micro Mouse around a circuit board picking up parts and placing them in the correct spot.  This version was poorly received by critics.

References

External links 

http://www.lemon64.com/?game_id=1667

1983 video games
Amstrad CPC games
Commodore 64 games
Single-player video games
Video games developed in the United Kingdom
ZX Spectrum games